is a professional Go player. He was born in Japanese occupied Manchukuo, and was raised in Ehime Prefecture.

Biography 
Tōno became a professional in 1951. In 1970, he became a 9 dan. He is affiliated to the Kansai Ki-in.

Title & runners-up

External links
GoBase Profile
Sensei's Library Profile

1939 births
Japanese Go players
Living people
Japanese people from Manchukuo
Sportspeople from Ehime Prefecture